The acronym XDK may stand for:
 Xbox Development Kit, a software development kit for Microsoft Xbox 
 Dunkerque - Les Moëres Airport IATA code